Nick Wickham is a British film and television director specialising in live performance, beginning his career in music and fashion by shooting and directing shows and on air presentations at MTV Europe. In 1997 he moved on to establish boutique film production company Splinter Films with Producer Emer Patten, where he worked as a multi camera director for live events on multiple platforms including cinema, TV, 3D, DVD and online digital streaming, before going freelance in 2017. He has worked extensively with some of the world's best-known musical artists, creating concert films for Madonna, Rihanna, Beyoncé, Metallica, Foo Fighters, The Cure, Katy Perry and Red Hot Chili Peppers as well as major Latin music artists such as Shakira, Carlos Santana, Alejandro Sanz and Ivete Sangalo.

Wickham is also a multi camera director for the National Theatre for the National Theatre Live series of live streams to cinema. Work includes A Streetcar Named Desire with Gillian Anderson, Ivo van Hove's production of A View from the Bridge with Mark Strong, Théâtre de Complicité's A Disappearing Number and the original production of The Curious Incident of the Dog in the Night-Time from the Young Vic.

Also made for cinema, with BBC Music and BBC Learning, are the groundbreaking classical music films Ten Pieces & Ten Pieces II, that have helped to establish a music curriculum for British primary and secondary schools.

Wickham's long form work has been nominated twice for a Latin Grammy, in addition to winning the award for Best Director (TV/DVD) at the 2006 CAD awards and best director at the TPi awards. In 2013, Katy Perry: Part of Me was awarded Best 3D Live Event at the 4th Annual Creative Arts Awards. Wickham's work for BBC Ten Pieces won a BAFTA in 2016 British Academy Children's Award.

Recent directorial credits

Notable earlier directorial credits 

 Red Hot Chili Peppers – Live at Slane Castle
 Shakira Live From Paris
 Foo Fighters Live at Wembley Stadium
 The Big 4 Live From Sofia, Bulgaria
 Madonna Sticky & Sweet Tour
 Beyoncé – I Am... Yours (Wynn Las Vegas)
The Corrs – MTV Unplugged
R.E.M. – This Way Up
The Cure – Trilogy

References

External links
 
https://www.nickwickham.com

British music video directors
Year of birth missing (living people)
Living people